16217 / 18 Mysore–Sainagar Shirdi Express is an Express train belonging to Indian Railways Southern Railway zone that run between  and  in India.

Service 
It operates as train number 16217 from Mysore Junction to Sainagar Shirdi and as train number 16218 in the reverse direction, serving the states of Karnataka, Andhra Pradesh & Maharashtra .

Coaches

The 16217 / 18 Mysore–Sainagar Shirdi Express has one AC 2-tier,  five AC 3-tier, 11 sleeper class, three general unreserved & two SLR (seating with luggage rake) coaches . It doesn't carries a pantry car.

As with most train services in India, coach composition may be amended at the discretion of Indian Railways depending on demand.

Coach composition

The train has standard ICF rakes with max speed of 110 kmph.

 1 AC I Tier 
 1 AC II Tier
 2 AC III Tier
 11 Sleeper coaches
 6 General
 2 Second-class Luggage/parcel van

Routeing

Schedule

Rake sharing

16209/16210 – Mysore Ajmer Express

Reversals

Traction
As this route is partially electrified, a Krishnarajapuram-based diesel WDP-4 loco pulls the train to its destination.

References

External links
16217 Mysore Junction Sainagar Shirdi Express at India Rail Info
16218 Sainagar Shirdi Mysore Junction Express at India Rail Info

Express trains in India
Rail transport in Karnataka
Rail transport in Andhra Pradesh
Rail transport in Maharashtra
Transport in Mysore
Transport in Shirdi